Laurel Park is a neighborhood in Richmond, California. It has its own neighborhood council, which has sent at least one president to the at large city council. The current president is Myrtle Braxton.

External links

Neighborhoods in Richmond, California